Martin James Daunton  (born 14 February 1949) is a British academic and historian. He was Master of Trinity Hall, Cambridge, between 2004 and 2014.

Daunton is the son of Ronald James Daunton and Dorothy née Bellett. He was educated at Barry Grammar School before going to the University of Nottingham where he graduated with a Bachelor of Arts degree in 1970. He studied further at the University of Kent (PhD, 1974) and received the degree of LittD from the University of Cambridge in 2005.

In 1984, he married Claire Gobbi.

Select bibliography
 Daunton, Martin J., ed. Coal Metropolis: Cardiff 1870–1914 (Leicester University, 1977).
 Daunton, Martin J. House and home in the Victorian city: working class housing, 1850–1914 (London: Edward Arnold, 1983).
 Daunton, Martin J. "'Gentlemanly Capitalism' and British Industry 1820–1914." Past & Present 122 (1989): 119–158. in JSTOR
 Daunton, Martin J. Progress and Poverty: an economic and social history of Britain 1700–1850. (Oxford UP, 1995).
 Daunton, Martin, and Matthew Hilton, eds. The Politics of Consumption: Material culture and citizenship in Europe and America. (Bloomsbury Publishing, 2001).
 Narlikar, Amrita, Martin Daunton, and Robert M. Stern, eds. The Oxford Handbook on the World Trade Organization (Oxford University Press, 2012).
 Moses, Julia, and Martin J. Daunton. "Editorial – Border Crossings: global dynamics of social policies and problems." Journal of Global History 9#2 (2014): 177–188.
 Daunton, Martin J. Royal Mail: the Post Office since 1840. (Bloomsbury Publishing, 2015).
 Daunton, Martin J. Housing the Workers, 1850–1914: a comparative perspective (Bloomsbury Publishing, 2015).

References

External links
 Professor Martin Daunton at Trinity Hall, Cambridge
 Donald Adamson at Debrett's People of Today
 Interviewed by Alan Macfarlane 2 August 2013 (video)

1949 births
Living people
Writers from Cardiff
People educated at Barry Comprehensive School
Alumni of the University of Nottingham
Alumni of the University of Kent
Fellows of the British Academy
Fellows of the Royal Historical Society
Presidents of the Royal Historical Society
20th-century Welsh historians
Masters of Trinity Hall, Cambridge
British male writers
Members of the University of Cambridge faculty of history
Male non-fiction writers
21st-century Welsh historians